Shiinoidae is a family of parasitic copepods.

Genera and species

The first species in the family to be described was Shiinoa occlusa, a single immature female of which was discovered on the fish Scomberomorus commerson, and described by Kabata in 1968. A second species, S. inauris, was found on Scomberomorus regalis and described by Roger Cressey in 1975, who also erected the family to hold the genus Shiinoa alone. A second genus was added in 1986, containing the single species Parashiinoa mackayi, which had been found on the fishes Pomadasys maculatus and P. argenteus. 

Nine species are now recognised in the two genera: 
Shiinoa Kabata, 1968
Shiinoa elagata Cressey, 1976
Shiinoa inauris Cressey, 1975
Shiinoa japonica Izawa, 2009
Shiinoa occlusa Kabata, 1968
Shiinoa prionura Izawa, 2009
Shiinoa rostrata Balaraman, Prabha & Pillai, 1984
Parashiinoa West, 1986
Parashiinoa bakeri (Cressey & Cressey, 1986)
Parashiinoa cookeola Izawa, 2009
Parashiinoa mackayi West, 1986

References

Poecilostomatoida
Crustacean families